Saint Joseph is an unincorporated community located in Daviess County, Kentucky, United States.  It is located around the intersection of Kentucky Route 56 and Kentucky Route 500.

Demographics

References

Unincorporated communities in Daviess County, Kentucky
Unincorporated communities in Kentucky